Hanukkah Rocks is a 2005 album by The LeeVees.

Track listing
“Latke Clan”
“Apple Sauce vs. Sour Cream”
“Goyim Friends”
“At the Timeshare”
“How Do You Spell Channukkahh?”
“Kugel”
“Jewish Girls (at the Matzoh Ball)”
“Gelt Melts”
“Nun, Gimmel, Heh, Shin”
(Hidden track)
“Holiday”

References

External links
"Applesauce vs. Sour Cream" lyrics
Music video, How Do You Spell Hanukkah?—Official Web Site
 Hanukkah Rocks with Band's CD
The LeeVees, Rocking Hanukkah—NPR
LeeVees Rock Hanukkah—Rolling Stone

2005 debut albums
The LeeVees albums
Reprise Records albums
Hanukkah music
Warner Records albums